is a Japanese mixed martial artist currently competing in the Featherweight division of Pancrase. A professional competitor since 2008, he has competed for the UFC and Shooto.

Mixed martial arts career

Early career
Tamura made his professional MMA debut in June 2008 for the Shooto organization.  Prior to signing with the UFC, all of his fights have taken place in this promotion where he amassed a record of 6 wins and 2 losses.

Tamura trains out of the Krazy Bee camp alongside former top-ranked fighter Kid Yamamoto.

Ultimate Fighting Championship
Tamura was signed to the UFC in February 2012. In his debut he fought Zhang Tiequan at UFC 144, filling in for an injured Leonard Garcia. Tamura won via KO at 0:32 seconds into the second round.

Tamura dropped down to bantamweight and faced Raphael Assunção on July 11, 2012, at UFC on Fuel TV: Munoz vs. Weidman  Tamura lost to Assunção via second round TKO.

Tamura was expected to face Mitch Gagnon on March 16, 2013, at UFC 158.  However, Gagnon was forced out of the bout with an injury and was replaced by T.J. Dillashaw. Tamura was defeated by Dillashaw in the second round via KO and was subsequently released from the promotion.

ROAD FC
On July 18, 2013, Korean MMA promotion ROAD FC announced that they had signed Issei Tamura to their roster. He debuted at ROAD FC 13 on October 12, 2013, against Min Jung Song.  He lost the fight via submission.

Pancrase
After three straight losses in Road FC, Tamura signed with Pancrase.

Racking two straight victories in Pancrase, Tamura earned a title shot for the vacant Pancrase Interim Featherweight Championship against Juntaro Ushiku at Pancrase 277 on April 24, 2016. He claimed the interim championship via third-round knockout.

Tamura was then expected to face reigning champion Andy Main in the title unification bout at Pancrase 282 on November 13, 2016. However, Tamura withdrew from the bout due to fractured nose.

He was then set to face Nazareno Malegarie for the Pancrase Featherweight Championship at Pancrase 285 on March 12, 2017. He lost the bout via first-round submission.

Tamura was scheduled to face Suguru Nii at Pancrase 313 on March 8, 2020. However, the event was postponed due to the COVID-19 pandemic and the bout was scrapped.

Tamura was then scheduled to face Yuki Takahashi at Pancrase 317 on August 23, 2020, but the event was cancelled due to the COVID-19 pandemic.

Tamura next faced Akira Okada at Pancrase 319 on October 25, 2020. He lost the fight via second-round knockout.

Tamura faced Hirotaka Nakada at Pancrase 321 on May 30, 2021. He lost the bout after his corner threw in the flag and stopped the fight in the first round.

Tamura faced Kisa Miyake at Pancrase 327 on April 29, 2022. He won the bout via unanimous decision.

Tamura faced Ryo Asami on December 25, 2022, at Pancrase 330, winning the bout via unanimous decision.

Championships and accomplishments

Mixed martial arts
Shooto'
Lightweight 2008 Rookie of the Year
2007 All Japan Championship Welterweight runner-up
Pancrase
King of Pancrase Interim Featherweight Championship (1 Time, former)

Mixed martial arts record

|-
| Win
| align=center| 15–12
| Ryo Asami
| Decision (unanimous)
| Pancrase 330
| 
| align=center| 3
| align=center| 5:00
| Yokohama, Japan
| 
|-
| Win
| align=center| 14–12
| Kisa Miyake
| Decision (unanimous)
| Pancrase 327
| 
| align=center| 3
| align=center| 5:00
| Tokyo, Japan
| 
|-
| Loss
| align=center| 13–12
| Hirotaka Nakada
| TKO (corner stoppage)
| Pancrase 321
| 
| align=center|1
| align=center| 3:36
| Tokyo, Japan
| 
|-
| Loss
| align=center| 13–11
| Akira Okada
| KO (punch)
| Pancrase 319
| 
| align=center| 2
| align=center| 0:42
| Tokyo, Japan
| 
|-
| Win
| align=center| 13–10
| Katsushi Sugiyama
| KO (punch)
| Pancrase 308
| 
| align=center| 1
| align=center| 1:25
| Tokyo, Japan
| 
|-
| Loss
| align=center| 12–10
| Kazumasa Majima
| Submission (arm-triangle choke)
| Pancrase 305
| 
| align=center| 3
| align=center| 3:41
| Tokyo, Japan
| 
|-
| Loss
| align=center| 12–9
| Taichi Nakajima
| Decision (unanimous)
|  Pancrase 299
| 
| align=center| 3
| align=center| 5:00
| Tokyo, Japan
| 
|-
| Win
| align=center| 12–8
| Yoshinori Horie
| TKO (punches)
| Pancrase 294
| 
| align=center| 2
| align=center| 1:28
| Tokyo, Japan
| 
|-
| Win
| align=center| 11–8
| Takumi Suzuki
| Decision (unanimous)
| Pancrase 291
| 
| align=center| 3
| align=center| 5:00
| Tokyo, Japan
| 
|-
|Loss
| align=center| 10–8
| Nazareno Malegarie
| Submission (rear-naked choke)
| Pancrase 285
| 
| align=center| 1
| align=center| 2:50
| Tokyo, Japan
|  
|-
| Win
| align=center| 10–7
| Juntaro Ushiku
| KO (punch)
| Pancrase 277
| 
| align=center| 3
| align=center| 1:52
| Tokyo, Japan
|  
|-
| Win
| align=center| 9–7
| Takumi Nakayama
| Decision (unanimous)
| Pancrase 273
| 
| align=center| 3
| align=center| 5:00
| Tokyo, Japan
| 
|-
| Win
| align=center| 8–7
| Hikaru Hasumi
| Decision (unanimous)
| Pancrase 269
| 
| align=center| 3
| align=center| 5:00
| Tokyo, Japan
| 
|-
| Loss
| align=center| 7–7
| Yeong Seung Cho
| Submission (rear-naked choke)
| Road Fighting Championship 22
| 
| align=center| 2
| align=center| 3:57
| Seoul, South Korea
| 
|-
| Loss
| align=center| 7–6
| Soo-Chul Kim
| Submission (rear-naked choke)
| Road Fighting Championship 15
| 
| align=center| 1
| align=center| 2:41
| Wonju, South Korea
| 
|-
| Loss
| align=center| 7–5
| Min-Jung Song
| Submission (rear-naked choke) 
| Road Fighting Championship 13
|   
| align=center| 3
| align=center| N/A
| Gumi, North Gyeongsang, South Korea
| 
|-
| Loss
| align=center| 7–4
| T.J. Dillashaw
| KO (head kick & punches)
| UFC 158
| 
| align=center| 2
| align=center| 0:26
| Montreal, Quebec, Canada
| 
|-
| Loss
| align=center| 7–3
| Raphael Assunção
| TKO (punches)
| UFC on Fuel TV: Munoz vs. Weidman
| 
| align=center| 2
| align=center| 0:25
| San Jose, California, United States
| 
|-
| Win
| align=center| 7–2
| Zhang Tiequan
| KO (punch)
| UFC 144
| 
| align=center| 2
| align=center| 0:32
| Saitama, Japan
| 
|-
| Loss
| align=center| 6–2
| Guy Delumeau
| Decision (majority)
| Shooto: Shooto the Shoot 2011
| 
| align=center| 3
| align=center| 5:00
| Tokyo, Japan
| 
|-
| Win
| align=center| 6–1
| Katsuya Toida
| KO (punches)
| Shooto: Gig Tokyo 7
| 
| align=center| 1
| align=center| 1:23
| Tokyo, Japan
| 
|-
| Loss
| align=center| 5–1
| Taiki Tsuchiya
| Decision (majority)
| Shooto: The Way of Shooto 4: Like a Tiger, Like a Dragon
| 
| align=center| 3
| align=center| 5:00
| Tokyo, Japan
| 
|-
| Win
| align=center| 5–0
| Gustavo Falciroli
| Decision (unanimous)
| Shooto: Revolutionary Exchanges 3
| 
| align=center| 3
| align=center| 5:00
| Tokyo, Japan
| 
|-
| Win
| align=center| 4–0
| Hayate Usui
| Decision (unanimous)
| Shooto: Gig Tokyo 2
| 
| align=center| 2
| align=center| 5:00
| Tokyo, Japan
| 
|-
| Win
| align=center| 3–0
| Naohiro Mizuno
| Decision (unanimous)
| Shooto: The Rookie Tournament 2008 Final
| 
| align=center| 2
| align=center| 5:00
| Tokyo, Japan
| 
|-
| Win
| align=center| 2–0
| Takumi Ota
| Decision (majority)
| Shooto: 10/13 in Kitazawa Town Hall
| 
| align=center| 2
| align=center| 5:00
| Tokyo, Japan
| 
|-
| Win
| align=center| 1–0
| Yasuhiro Kanayama
| Decision (unanimous)
| Shooto: 6/26 in Kitazawa Town Hall
| 
| align=center| 2
| align=center| 5:00
| Tokyo, Japan
|

See also
List of male mixed martial artists

References

External links 

Official Shooto profile
Official UFC Profile

1984 births
Living people
Japanese male mixed martial artists
Featherweight mixed martial artists
Mixed martial artists utilizing shootfighting
Mixed martial artists utilizing Brazilian jiu-jitsu
Japanese practitioners of Brazilian jiu-jitsu
People from Shinagawa
Ultimate Fighting Championship male fighters